Ophiuridae are a large family of brittle stars of the suborder	Ophiurina.

Description 
The arms are simple and unbranched, projecting from and well-fused to the edge of the disc. These arms move horizontally. The arm spines short and movable. They lie flat against the arms when stimulated, but held erect when the brittle star is at rest. Disc and arms are covered in naked, distinct scales. The scales are situated at both sides of the disc.

The jaw is surrounded by a continuous series of mouth papillae. The base of the arm contains a single arm comb or an inner and outer arm comb.

Systematics and phylogeny
The fossils of Ophiuridae date back to Carboniferous (Aganaster†). The family includes the following living genera:

Anthophiura
Astrophiura
Dictenophiura
Euvondrea
Gymnophiura
Haplophiura
Homophiura
Ophiambix
Ophioceramis
Ophiochalcis
Ophiochorus
Ophiochrysis
Ophiocrates
Ophiocrossota
Ophioctenella
Ophiocypris
Ophioelegans
Ophiogona
Ophiolipus
Ophiomisidium
Ophionotus
Ophiopenia
Ophiophyllum
Ophiopleura
Ophiopyren
Ophiopyrgus
Ophiosphalma
Ophiosteira
Ophioteichus
Ophiotjalfa
Ophiotylos
Ophiotypa
Ophiozona
Ophiura
Ophiuraster
Ophiurinae
Ophiuroglypha
Sinophiura
Spinophiura
Stegophiura
Theodoria
Uriopha

(This list includes the genera sometimes placed in the family Ophioleucidae, here included in Ophiuridae as the subfamily Ophioleucinae).

References

 Hansson, H.G. (2001). Echinodermata, in: Costello, M.J. et al. (Ed.) (2001). European register of marine species: a check-list of the marine species in Europe and a bibliography of guides to their identification. Collection Patrimoines Naturels, 50: pp. 336–351
 P.J. Hayward and J.S. E-Ryland (ed.), Handbook of the Marine Fauna of North-West Europe, Oxford University Press, Oxford, 1996, 

 
Ophiurida
Echinoderm families
Mississippian first appearances
Extant Carboniferous first appearances